Gimbi is a town in western Oromia Region, Ethiopia. It is the administrative center of Gimbi woreda.

Gimbi has had telephone service from some point between 1954 and 1967. Iron had traditionally been produced in the area. A North Korean team of specialists investigated the deposits in the mid-1980s.

History 
An Ethiopian Orthodox church was built in Gimbi around 1895. By the 1930s, Gimbi was one of the most important markets of Welega Province and a meeting point of roads. The extension of the main road to Nekemte had not yet reached as far as Gimbi by 1935.

A school for the blind was opened in Gimbi by the Western Synod of the Mekane Yesus Church in 1971. However, by 1981 all Evangelical churches in the neighboring region were closed, except the one in the town itself.

Seventh Day Adventist Churches, and Schools, have been serving the city. The Seventh Day Adventist Hospital was the first hospital in Gimbie and was founded in 1947. More recently a government hospital called Gimbie Public Hospital was established. The operational budget of this hospital is government subsidized.

The Oromia TV sub-station and the Gimbi Campus of Wollega University were opened by Regional president Abadula Gemeda 23 February 2009. In June 2022 the Oromo Liberation Front besieged the town and heavy gunfire was reported.

Demographics 
The 2007 national census reported a total population for Gimbi of 30,981, of whom 15,716 were men and 15,265 were women. The majority of the inhabitants observed Protestantism, with 50.07% reporting that as their religion, while 35.33% observed Ethiopian Orthodox Christianity, and 12.99% were Muslim.

Based on figures from the Central Statistical Agency in 2005, Gimbi has an estimated total population of 36,612, of whom 18,623 are men and 17,989 are women. The 1994 census reported this town had a total population of 20,462 of whom 10,100 were men and 10,362 were women.

In popular culture
In the fictional Harry Potter universe, Gimbi is the hometown of the professional Quidditch team the Gimbi Giant-Slayers.

References 

Populated places in the Oromia Region
Ethiopia
Cities and towns in Ethiopia